Scedosporium is a genus of fungi in the family Microascaceae.

The genus shed the alternative name Pseudallescheria as the "One Fungus, One Name" principle overtook the previous dual naming system, which had a distinct names for the anamorph and teleomorph.

Species and species complexes
The following are based on Ramirez-Garcia et al., 2018
 Scedosporium apiospermum Species complex
 Scedosporium angustum
 Scedosporium apiospermum
 Scedosporium boydii Species complex
 Scedosporium ellipsoideum
 Scedosporium fusarium
 Scedosporium prolificans
 Scedosporium aurantiacum
 Scedosporium minutisporum
 Scedosporium desertorum
 Scedosporium cereisporum
 Scedosporium dehoogii Species complex

See also
 Scedosporiosis
 Pseudallescheria

References

Microascales